International relations since 1989 covers the main trends in world affairs in the post–Cold War era.

Trends

The 21st century has been marked by growing economic globalization and integration, with consequent increased risk to interlinked economies, as exemplified by the Great Recession of the late 2000s and early 2010s. This period has also seen the expansion of communications with mobile phones and the Internet, which have caused fundamental societal changes in business, politics, and how individuals networked along common interests and sought information.

Worldwide competition for resources has risen due to growing populations and industrialization, especially in India, China, and Brazil. The increased demands are contributing to increased environmental degradation and to global warming.

International tensions were heightened in connection with the efforts of some nuclear-armed states to induce North Korea to give up its nuclear weapons, and to prevent Iran from developing nuclear weapons.

In 2020, the COVID-19 pandemic became the first pandemic since 1919 to substantially disrupt global trading and cause recessions in the global economy.

1990s

The 1990s saw a dramatic advance in technology, with the World Wide Web. Predominant factors and trends included the continued mass mobilization of capital markets through neo-liberalism, the thawing and sudden end of the Cold War after four decades of fear, the beginning of the widespread proliferation of new media such as the Internet and email and increasing skepticism towards government. The dissolution of the Soviet Union in 1991 led to a realignment and reconsolidation of economic and political power across the world and within countries. The dot-com bubble of 1997–2000 brought wealth to some entrepreneurs before its crash between 2000 and 2001.

New ethnic conflicts started in Africa and the Balkans, causing the Rwandan and Bosnian genocides. Signs of any resolution of tensions between Israel and the Arab world remained elusive despite the progress of the Oslo Accords. On a peaceful note, after 30 years of violence, The Troubles in Northern Ireland came to a standstill with the signing of the Good Friday Agreement in 1998.

Collapse of communist parties

Communist party support collapsed rapidly in most of the world (outside East Asia). Adherents were shocked at the failure of Gorbachev to reform and reestablish Communism in Russia, and the quick overthrow in Eastern Europe in 1989. The Kremlin ended financial aid and leadership roles. For example, financial aid to multiple countries in Latin America was ended in budget cutbacks.

Rise of neoliberalism

Neoliberalism became a main trend in many developed countries. It meant heavy reliance on market capitalism, and global flows of investment, together with deregulation and cutbacks in welfare spending. Economist Milton Friedman, leader of the Chicago school of economics was a prominent exponent. In the 1980s Ronald Reagan and Margaret Thatcher had led the way in the United States and the United Kingdom.

2000s

Worldwide economic downturn

The early part of the decade saw the long-time predicted breakthrough of economic giant China, which had double-digit growth during nearly the whole decade. To a lesser extent, India also benefited from an economic boom, which saw the two most populous countries becoming an increasingly dominant economic force. The rapid catching-up of emerging economies with developed countries sparked some protectionist tensions during the period and was partly responsible for an increase in energy and food prices at the end of the decade. The economic developments in the latter third of the decade were dominated by a worldwide economic downturn, which started with the crisis in housing and credit in the United States in late 2007 and led to the bankruptcy of major banks and other financial institutions. The outbreak of this global financial crisis sparked a global recession, beginning in the United States and affecting most of the industrialized world.

Internet
The growth of the Internet contributed to globalization during the decade, which allowed faster communication among people around the world. Social networking sites arose as a new way for people to stay in touch no matter where they were, as long as they had an internet connection. The first social networking sites were Friendster, Myspace, Facebook, and Twitter, established from 2002 to 2006. Myspace was the most popular social networking website until June 2009, when Facebook overtook it. E-mail continued to be popular throughout the decade and began to replace paper-based "snail mail" as the primary way of sending letters and other messages to people in distant locations.

War on terror
The war on terror and War in Afghanistan began after the September 11 attacks in 2001. The International Criminal Court was formed in 2002. In 2003, a United States-led coalition invaded Iraq, and the Iraq War led to the end of Saddam Hussein's rule as Iraqi President and the Ba'ath Party in Iraq. Al-Qaeda and affiliated Islamist militant groups performed terrorist acts throughout the decade. The Second Congo War, the deadliest conflict since World War II, ended in July 2003. Further wars that ended included the Algerian Civil War, the Angolan Civil War, the Sierra Leone Civil War, the Second Liberian Civil War, the Nepalese Civil War, and the Sri Lankan Civil War. Wars that began included the conflict in the Niger Delta, the Houthi insurgency in Yemen, and the Mexican Drug War.

Climate change
Climate change and global warming became common concerns in the 2000s. Prediction tools made significant progress during the decade.  Since the 1990s, research into historical and modern climate change has expanded rapidly.  Measurement networks such as the Global Ocean Observing System, Integrated Carbon Observation System, and NASA's Earth Observing System now enable monitoring of the causes and effects of ongoing change.  Research has also broadened, linking many fields such as Earth sciences, behavioral sciences, economics, and security.  UN-sponsored organizations such as the IPCC gained influence, and studies such as the Stern report influenced public support for paying the political and economic costs of countering climate change. The global temperature kept climbing during the decade. In December 2009, the World Meteorological Organization (WMO) announced that the 2000s may have been the warmest decade since records began in 1850, with four of the five warmest years since 1850 having occurred in this decade. The WMO's findings were later echoed by the NASA and the NOAA.

2010s

The decade began amid a global financial crisis and subsequent international recession dating from 2007. The resulting European sovereign-debt crisis became more pronounced early in the decade and continued to affect the possibility of a global economic recovery. Economic issues, such as austerity, inflation, and an increase in commodity prices, led to unrest in many countries, including the 15-M and Occupy movements. Unrest in some countries—particularly Arab Spring in the Arab world—evolved into revolutions in Tunisia, Egypt, and Bahrain as well as civil wars in Libya, Syria, and Yemen. Shifting social norms saw a growth of LGBT rights and female representation.

The United States continued to retain its global superpower. The emerging competitor was China, with its vast economic initiatives and military reforms. China sought to expand its influence in the South China Sea and in Africa, solidifying its position as an emerging global superpower. The worldwide competition between China and the U.S. coalesced into a "containment" effort and a trade war.

Elsewhere in Asia, the two Koreas improved their relations after a prolonged crisis. The War on Terror continued as Osama bin Laden was assassinated by U.S. forces. The rise of the Islamic State of Iraq and the Levant extremist organisation in 2014 erased the borders between Syria and Iraq, resulting in a multinational intervention that also saw the demise of its leader. In Africa, South Sudan broke away from Sudan, and mass protests and various coups d'état saw longtime strongmen deposed. In the US, Donald Trump became president. He called for "America First," reduced ties to NATO and other allies, and started a trade war with China. He was defeated for reelection in 2020, and Washington resumed its traditional ties.

The European Union experienced a migrant crisis in the middle of the decade and the historic United Kingdom EU membership referendum followed by withdrawal negotiations during its later years. Under President Vladimir Putin, Russia asserted itself in international affairs annexing Crimea in 2014 and engaging in conflict in Ukraine and Georgia. Putin also suppressed dissent inside Russia.

Information technology progressed, with smartphones becoming widespread. The Internet of things saw substantial growth during the 2010s due to advancements in wireless networking devices, mobile telephony, and cloud computing. Advancements in data processing and the rollout of 4G broadband allowed data and information to disperse among domains at paces never before seen while online resources such as social media facilitated phenomena such as the Me Too movement and the rise of slacktivism, Woke culture and online call-out culture. Online nonprofit organisation WikiLeaks gained international attention for publishing classified information on topics including Guantánamo Bay, Syria, the Afghan and Iraq wars, and United States diplomacy. Edward Snowden blew the whistle on global surveillance, raising awareness on the role governments and private entities have in mass surveillance and information privacy.

2020s

COVID

Before COVID hit in 2020, economic conditions were faltering. The UN reported:
World gross product growth slipped to 2.3 per cent in 2019—the lowest rate since the global financial crisis of 2008–2009. This slowdown is occurring alongside growing discontent with the social and environmental quality of economic growth, amid pervasive inequalities and the deepening climate crisis.<ref>UN, "World Economic Situation and Prospects: 2020 (2020) page viii.</ref>

In 2020, the COVID-19 pandemic quickly spread to over 200 countries and territories in the world. This pandemic has caused severe global economic disruption, including the largest global recession since the Great Depression. It led to postponement or cancellation of sporting, religious, political and cultural events, widespread supply shortages, leading to panic buying, and decreased emissions of pollutants and greenhouse gases. Many countries have mandatory lockdowns on public movement, and there have been more than 600 million cases, resulting in more than 6 million deaths. 

United States

During the presidency of Donald Trump, U.S. foreign policy was noted for its unpredictability and reneging on prior international commitments, upending diplomatic conventions, embracing political and economic brinkmanship with most adversaries, and straining relations with traditional allies. Trump's "America First" policy pursued nationalist foreign policy objectives and prioritized bilateral relations over multinational agreements. As president, Trump described himself as a nationalist while espousing isolationist, non-interventionist, and protectionist views; he personally praised some populist, neo-nationalist, illiberal, and authoritarian governments, while antagonizing others, as administration diplomats nominally continued to pursue pro-democracy ideals abroad.

The presidency of Joe Biden emphasizes repairing the U.S.'s alliances, which had been damaged under the Trump administration,Phil Stewart, Idrees Ali & Robin Emmott, In NATO debut, Biden's Pentagon aims to rebuild trust damaged by Trump, Reuters (February 15, 2021). and returning the U.S. to a "position of trusted leadership" among world democracies to counter challenges from Russia and China.Paul Sonne, To counter China and Russia, Biden has said he will strengthen alliances, Washington Post (December 9, 2020).David E. Sanger, Steven Erlanger and Roger Cohen, Biden Tells Allies 'America Is Back,' but Macron and Merkel Push Back, New York Times (February 19, 2021). As president, Biden has sought to strengthen the transatlantic alliance between the U.S. and Europe, and he recommitted the U.S. to the NATO alliance and collective security. Biden returned the U.S. to the Paris Climate Agreement and has taken other steps to combat climate change. His administration emphasizes international cooperation to combat the COVID-19 pandemic,Aamer Madhani, Biden rolling out plan for $4 billion global vaccine effort, Associated Press (February 19, 2021). as well as U.S. defenses against foreign-sponsored cyberattacks and cyberespionage.Christopher Bing & Joseph Menn, After big hack of U.S. government, Biden enlists 'world class' cybersecurity team, Reuters (January 22, 2021).

AUKUS

AUKUS is a new trilateral security pact between Australia, the United Kingdom and the United States, announced on September 15, 2021. It will initially focus on a fleet of nuclear-powered submarines for the Royal Australian Navy. It is designed to counter China's influence in the Indo-Pacific region. AUKUS will enable the three countries to share information in areas including artificial intelligence, cyber, underwater systems and long-range strike capabilities. As part of the pact, the United States and Britain would share their knowledge of how to maintain nuclear defence infrastructure. The agreement is a successor to the existing ANZUS pact between Australia, New Zealand and the United States, but with New Zealand "sidelined" due to its ban on nuclear technology.

Russian invasion of Ukraine

On 21 February 2022, Russia officially recognised the two self-proclaimed separatist states in the Donbas, and openly sent troops into the territories.  On 24 February 2022, Russia invaded Ukraine in a major escalation of the Russo-Ukrainian War that began in 2014. The invasion caused Europe's largest refugee crisis since World War II, with more than 6.4 million Ukrainians fleeing the country and a third of the population displaced.  The invasion also caused global food shortages, and oil shortages in Europe. 

Led by NATO, the European Community, and the United States, much of the international community has heavily condemned Russia, accusing it of breaking international law and grossly violating Ukrainian sovereignty. Many countries implemented cultural, business, and financial sanctions against Russia, Russian individuals, and Russian companies. Many corporations and organizations ended their relations with Russia, especially regarding high technology and the arts. NATO countries sharply cut their imports of Russian oil and gas, preparing for a complete cutoff. After Russian President Vladimir Putin silenced opposition, many dissenters fled Russia. Volodymyr Zelenskyy, Ukraine's president, became an international icon for leading the resistance.

Politics, wars and states

New countries and territorial changes
Some territories have gained independence during the 21st century. This is a list of sovereign states that have gained independence in the 21st century and have been recognized by the UN.

  East Timor (Timor-Leste) on May 20, 2002.
  Montenegro on June 3, 2006.
  Serbia on June 3, 2006.
  South Sudan on July 9, 2011.

These nations gained sovereignty through government reform.

 Union of the Comoros on December 23, 2001, replaced the Federal Islamic Republic of the Comoros
 Transitional Islamic State of Afghanistan on July 13, 2002, replaced the Islamic State of Afghanistan
  State Union of Serbia and Montenegro on February 4, 2003, replaced the Federal Republic of Yugoslavia
 Islamic Republic of Afghanistan on December 7, 2004, replaced the Transitional Islamic State of Afghanistan
  Federal Democratic Republic of Nepal on May 28, 2008, replaced the Kingdom of Nepal
  National Transitional Council of Libya on October 20, 2011, replaced the Great Socialist People's Libyan Arab Jamahiriya.
  State of Libya on August 8, 2012, replaced the National Transitional Council of Libya.
  Islamic Emirate of Afghanistan on August 15, 2021, replaced the Islamic Republic of Afghanistan.

These territories have declared independence and secured relative autonomy but they have only been recognized by some UN member states:
  Kosovo on February 17, 2008. (partially recognized)
  Donetsk People's Republic and  Luhansk People's Republic in May 2014. Founded by separatists from Ukraine in the War in Donbas. The states briefly confederated as  Novorossiya, which was dissolved in 2015. (partially recognized)

These territories have declared independence and secured relative autonomy but they have been recognized by no one:
  Islamic State of Iraq and the Levant in June 2014. Had taken over much of Iraq, Syria and Libya. It is considered a terrorist organization.
  Republic of Catalonia on October 27, 2017. The Catalan Parliament proclaimed the Catalan Republic, but the Kingdom of Spain did not recognise this and for a time imposed direct rule. (See 2017 Catalan independence referendum and 2017–2018 Spanish constitutional crisis)
  Southern Transitional Council in March 2017. Claimed the majority of the southern part of Yemen and the restoration of South Yemen.

These territories were annexed from a sovereign country, the action has only been recognized by some UN member states:
  Crimea annexed from Ukraine into the Russian Federation on March 18, 2014.

These territories were ceded to another country:

   India–Bangladesh enclaves, traded between the two countries in 2015.
  Armenian-occupied territories surrounding Nagorno-Karabakh and the Lachin corridor, surrendered by Armenia to Azerbaijan at the end of the 2020 Nagorno-Karabakh war.

Major issues

Economics, and trade
Taxation
Finance officials from 130 countries agreed on July 1, 2021, to plans for a new global minimum corporate tax rate. All the major economies agreed to pass national laws that would require corporations to pay at least 15% income tax in the countries they operate. This new policy would end the practice of locating world headquarters in small countries with very low taxation rates. Governments hope to recoup some of the lost revenue, estimated at $100 billion to $240 billion each year. The new system was promoted by the United States and the Organization for Economic Cooperation and Development (OECD). Secretary-General Mathias Cormann of the OECD said, "This historic package will ensure that large multinational companies pay their fair share of tax everywhere." On July 10 the finance ministers of the G-20 all approved the plan.

Technology

Rise of China

China's economy saw continuous real annual GDP growth 5% to 10% since 1991, by far the highest rate in the world. Starting poor, it became rich as a nation with dwindling pockets of poverty in remote rural areas. A very heavy migration of hundreds of millions of people moved from villages to cities to provide the labor force. In early 1992, Chinese leader Deng Xiaoping made a series of political pronouncements designed to give new impetus to and reinvigorate the process of economic reform. The National Communist Party Congress backed up Deng's renewed push for market reforms, stating that the key task in the 1990s was to create a "socialist market economy". Continuity in the political system but bolder reform in the economic system were announced as the hallmarks of the 10-year development plan. Deng's government spent heavily to improve the infrastructure of highways, subways, railways, airports, bridges, dams, aqueducts and other public works. China became the world's largest manufacturer and exporter. Major problems worsened such as pollution and income inequality. By 2020, the Chinese Communist Party of general secretary Xi Jinping was shifting from manufacturing to consumer services and high technology. Planners hoped the resulting growth, though less rapid, would be more sustainable.Elizabeth C. Economy, "China's New Revolution: The Reign of Xi Jinping." Foreign Affairs 97 (2018): 60+. online

The Belt and Road Initiative is China's dramatic plan for helping and directing economic development in 70 poor nations of Asia and Africa. It launched in 2013 and focused on massive construction projects involving ocean ports, office buildings, railroads, highways, airports, dams, and tunnels.For the historiography see Jean-Marc F. Blanchard, "Belt and Road Initiative (BRI) blues: Powering BRI research back on track to avoid choppy seas." Journal of Chinese Political Science (2021): 1–21; online

German recovery

The unification of rich West Germany with poor East Germany in the 1990s was an expensive proposition. The German economic miracle petered out in the 1990s, so that by the end of the century and the early 2000s it was ridiculed as "the sick man of Europe." It suffered a short recession in 2003. The economic growth rate was a very low 1.2% annually from 1988 to 2005. Unemployment, especially in the former East, remained high despite heavy stimulus spending. It rose from 9.2% in 1998 to 11.1% in 2009. Germany was the world's largest net exporter of goods from 2002 to 2008. The worldwide Great Recession of 2008–2010 worsened conditions briefly, as there was a sharp decline in GDP. However, unemployment did not rise, and recovery was faster than almost anywhere else. Prosperity was pulled along by exports that reached a record of US$1.7 trillion in 2011, or half of the German GDP, or nearly 8% of all of the exports in the world. While the rest of the European Community struggled with financial issues, Germany took a conservative position based on an extraordinarily strong economy after 2010. The labor market proved flexible, and the export industries were attuned to world demand.Florian Spohr, "Germany's Labour Market Policies: How the Sick Man of Europe Performed a Second Economic Miracle." in Great Policy Successes (Oxford UP, 2019) pp. 283–303 online.

Human rights

There is a large recent literature on human rights covering a wide variety of topics.Robert F. Gorman, and Edward S. Mihalkanin, eds. Historical Dictionary of Human Rights and Humanitarian Organizations (2007) excerptMicheline Ishay, ed. The Human Rights Reader: Major Political Essays, Speeches, and Documents from Ancient Times to the Present (2nd ed. 2007) excerpt

Race, poverty, and inequality

French economist Thomas Piketty gained international attention in 2013 for his book on Capital in the Twenty-First Century. He focuses on wealth and income inequality in Europe and the US today and since the 18th century. The book's central thesis is that inequality is not an accident but rather a feature of capitalism that can be reversed only through state intervention. The book thus argues that unless capitalism is reformed, the very democratic order will be threatened. The book reached number one on The New York Times bestselling hardcover nonfiction list from May 18, 2014. Piketty offered a "possible remedy: a global tax on wealth".

Global warming and environment

The politics of climate change results from different perspectives on how to respond to the threat of global warming. Global warming is driven largely by the emissions of greenhouse gases due to human economic activity, especially the burning of fossil fuels, certain industries like cement and steel production, and land use for agriculture and forestry. Since the industrial revolution, fossil fuels have provided the main source of energy for economic and technological development. Carbon-intensive industries and people and entities associated with these industries have resisted change to this economic system, despite widespread scientific consensus for the need to mitigate the causes and effects. Despite resistance, efforts to mitigate climate change have been prominent on the international political agenda since the 1990s and are also increasingly addressed at national and local level.For updates see "Our coverage of climate change" The Economist (2021).

The 1997 Kyoto Protocol included commitments for most developed countries to limit their emissions. During negotiations, the G77 (representing developing countries) pushed for a mandate requiring developed countries to "[take] the lead" in reducing their emissions, since developed countries contributed most to the accumulation of greenhouse gases in the atmosphere, and since per-capita emissions were still relatively low in developing countries and emissions of developing countries would grow to meet their development needs.

In 2019 the five largest sources of global emissions were China (27%), the United States (11%), India (6.6%), and the European Union (6.4%). In April 2021, President Biden presided at a global conference of 40 national leaders who all made commitments on reducing global warming. The U.S. announced that by 2030 it planned to cut its 2005 emission levels in half. CCP general secretary Xi Jinping announced China would limit its coal-based emissions and pledged net-zero emissions by 2060.

International rivalry
U.S. versus China

According to German scholar Peter Rudolph in 2020, the Sino-American conflict syndrome involves six elements:

For additional overviews see Westad (2019) and Mark (2012).

 George H. W. Bush administration (1989–1993) 

Americans who had been optimistic about the emergence of democratic characteristics in response to the rapid economic growth and China were stunned and disappointed by the brutal crackdown of the pro-democratic Tiananmen Square protests in 1989. The U.S. and other governments enacted a number of measures against China's violation of human rights. The US suspended high-level official exchanges with the PRC and weapons exports from the US to the PRC. The US also imposed a number of economic sanctions. The crisis disrupted trade relationships as investors' interest in mainland China dropped dramatically. Tourist traffic fell off sharply. Washington denounced the repression and suspended certain trade and investment programs. Bush himself knew China well as a former chief diplomat stationed there and played a cautious hand so that condemnation would not preclude good ties. For example, he vetoed a sanctions bill passed by Congress.Robert Suettinger, Beyond Tiananmen: The Politics of US-China Relations, 1989–2000 (Brookings Institution Press, 2004), pp 88–144.

 Joe Biden administration (2021–) 

Relations with the new Biden administration in 2021 included heightened tensions over trade, technology and human rights, particularly regarding Hong Kong, and the treatment of minorities in China. In addition, international tensions regarding control of the South China Sea remained high. However, the Biden and Xi administrations agreed to collaborate on long-term projects regarding climate change, nuclear proliferation, and the global COVID-19 pandemic.

Winter Olympics 2022 in China

China celebrated a "joyless triumph" in games with few spectators because of severe anti-covid restrictions. There were no disasters but Russian athletes were again embarrassed by a doping scandal, the media coverage was eclipsed by rising war fears in Europe regarding Russia and Ukraine, and growing anxiety about the future of the sporting movement, according to Steven Lee Myers and Kevin Draper. Of the 91 countries participating, Norway and Germany dominated the medal count, followed by the Russian athletes who played regardless of Russia itself being banned for a major doping scandal. Orville Schell, an American expert on China, stated: "Such an august occasion, designed to promote openness, good sportsmanship and transnational solidarity, ended up being a heavily policed, brittle, Potemkin-like simulacrum of the Olympic ideal."

Globalization

Since World War II, barriers to international trade have been considerably lowered through international agreements – GATT. The Washington Consensus of 1989 set out best practices according to major world agencies. Particular initiatives carried out as a result of GATT and the World Trade Organization (WTO), for which GATT is the foundation, have included:

 Promotion of free trade:
 Elimination of tariffs; creation of free trade zones with small or no tariffs
 Reduced transportation costs, especially resulting from development of containerization for ocean shipping.
 Reduction or elimination of capital controls
 Reduction, elimination, or harmonization of subsidies for local businesses
 Creation of subsidies for global corporations
 Harmonization of intellectual property laws across the majority of states, with more restrictions
 Supranational recognition of intellectual property restrictions (e.g., patents granted by China would be recognized in the United States)
Cultural globalization, driven by communication technology and the worldwide marketing of Western cultural industries, was understood at first as a process of homogenization, as the global domination of American culture at the expense of traditional diversity. However, a contrasting trend soon became evident in the emergence of movements protesting against globalization and giving new momentum to the defense of local uniqueness, individuality, and identity.

The Uruguay Round (1986 to 1994) led to a treaty to create the WTO to mediate trade disputes and set up a uniform platform of trading. Other bilateral and multilateral trade agreements, including sections of Europe's Maastricht Treaty and the North American Free Trade Agreement (NAFTA) have also been signed in pursuit of the goal of reducing tariffs and barriers to trade.

World exports rose to 16.2% in 2001 from 8.5% in 1970, of total gross world product.

In the 1990s, the growth of low-cost communication networks allowed work done using a computer to be moved to low wage locations for many job types. This included accounting, software development, and engineering design.

Great economic recession 2007–2009

In 2007–2009 most of the industrialized world suffered a deep recession.
After 2001 there was a global rise in prices in commodities and housing, marking an end to the commodities recession of 1980–2000. The US mortgage-backed securities, which had risks that were hard to assess, were marketed around the world and a broad-based credit boom fed a global speculative bubble in real estate and equities. The financial situation was also affected by a sharp increase in oil and food prices. The collapse of the American housing bubble caused the values of securities tied to mortgages to plummet thereafter, damaging financial institutions. The late-2000s recession, a severe economic recession which began in the United States in 2007, was sparked by the outbreak of a modern financial crisis. The modern financial crisis was linked to earlier lending practices by financial institutions and the trend of securitization of American real estate mortgages. The emergence of Sub-prime loan losses exposed other risky loans and over-inflated asset prices.

The downturn quickly spread to most of the industrialized world and caused a pronounced deceleration of economic activity. The global recession occurred in an economic environment characterized by various imbalances. It caused a sharp drop in international trade, rising unemployment and slumping commodity prices. The recession renewed interest in Keynesian economic ideas on how to combat recessionary conditions. However, various industrial countries continued to undertake austerity policies to cut deficits, reduced spending, as opposed to following Keynesian theories which called for increased spending to bolster demand.

From late 2009 European sovereign-debt crisis, fears of a sovereign debt crisis developed among investors concerning rising government debt levels across the globe together with a wave of downgrading of government debt of certain European states. Concerns intensified early 2010 and thereafter making it difficult or impossible for sovereigns to re-finance their debts. On May 9, 2010, Europe's Finance Ministers approved a rescue package worth €750 billion aimed at ensuring financial stability across Europe. The European Financial Stability Facility (EFSF) was a special purpose vehicle financed by members of the eurozone to combat the European sovereign debt crisis. In October 2011 eurozone leaders agreed on another package of measures designed to prevent the collapse of member economies. The three most affected countries, Greece, Ireland and Portugal, collectively account for six percent of eurozone's gross domestic product (GDP). In 2012, Eurozone finance ministers reached an agreement on a second €130-billion Greek bailout. In 2013, the European Union agreed to a €10 billion economic bailout for Cyprus.

Asia
1997 Asian financial crisis

Until 1999, Asia attracted almost half of the total capital inflow into developing countries. The economies of Southeast Asia in particular maintained high interest rates attractive to foreign investors looking for a high rate of return. As a result, the region's economies received a large inflow of money and experienced a dramatic run-up in asset prices. At the same time, the regional economies of Thailand, Malaysia, Indonesia, Singapore and South Korea experienced high growth rates, of 8–12% GDP, in the late 1980s and early 1990s. This achievement was widely acclaimed by financial institutions including the IMF and World Bank and was known as part of the "Asian economic miracle".Bhumika Muchhala, ed. Ten Years After: Revisiting the Asian Financial Crisis. (Woodrow Wilson International Center for Scholars: Asia Program, 2007).

The Asian financial crisis was a sudden financial crisis that gripped much of East Asia and Southeast Asia beginning in July 1997 and raised fears of a worldwide economic meltdown due to financial contagion. However, the recovery in 1998–1999 was rapid.Shalendra Sharma, The Asian Financial Crisis: New International Financial Architecture: Crisis, Reform and Recovery (Manchester University Press, 2003)

The crisis started in Thailand on July 2, 1997, with the financial collapse of the Thai baht after the Thai government was forced to float the baht due to a severe shortage of foreign currency to peg to the U.S. dollar. Capital flight ensued almost immediately, beginning an international chain reaction. At the time, Thailand had acquired a burden of foreign debt. As the crisis spread, most of Southeast Asia and Japan saw slumping currencies, devalued stock markets and other asset prices, and a precipitous rise in private debt.

Indonesia, South Korea, and Thailand were the countries most affected by the crisis. Hong Kong, Laos, Malaysia and the Philippines were also hurt badly. However, China as well as Singapore, Taiwan, and Vietnam were less affected, although all suffered from a loss of demand and confidence throughout the region. Japan was also affected, though less significantly.
 
Foreign debt-to-GDP ratios rose in most of Asia during the worst of the crisis. In South Korea, the ratios rose from 13% to 21% and then as high as 40%, while the other northern newly industrialized countries fared much better. Only in Thailand and South Korea did debt service-to-exports ratios rise.

The International Monetary Fund (IMF) stepped in to initiate a $40 billion program to stabilize the currencies of South Korea, Thailand, and Indonesia, economies particularly hard hit by the crisis. The efforts to stem a global economic crisis did little to stabilize the domestic situation in Indonesia, however. After 30 years in power, Indonesian President Suharto was forced to step down on May 21, 1998, in the wake of widespread rioting that followed sharp price increases caused by a drastic devaluation of the rupiah. The effects of the crisis lingered through 1998. In 1998, growth in the Philippines dropped to virtually zero. Only Singapore and Taiwan proved relatively insulated from the shock, but both suffered serious hits in passing, the former due to its size and geographical location between Malaysia and Indonesia. By 1999, however, the economies of Asia were recovering rapidly. After the crisis, the affected economies worked toward better financial supervision.

Europe
Following the end of the Cold War, the European Economic Community pushed for closer integration, co-operation in foreign and home affairs, and started to increase its membership into the neutral and former communist countries. In 1993, the Maastricht Treaty established the European Union, succeeding the EEC and furthering political co-operation. The neutral countries of Austria, Finland and Sweden acceded to the EU, and those that didn't join were tied into the EU's economic market via the European Economic Area. These countries also entered the Schengen Agreement which lifted border controls between member states.The Maastricht Treaty created a single currency for most EU members. The euro was created in 1999 and replaced all previous currencies in participating states in 2002. The most notable exception to the currency union, or eurozone, was the United Kingdom, which also did not sign the Schengen Agreement.

The EU did not participate in the Yugoslav Wars and was divided on supporting the United States in the 2003–2011 Iraq War. NATO has been part of the war in Afghanistan, but at a much lower level of involvement than the United States.

In 2004, the EU gained 10 new members. (Estonia, Latvia, and Lithuania, which had been part of the Soviet Union; Czech Republic, Hungary, Poland, Slovakia, and Slovenia, five former-communist countries; Malta, and the divided island of Cyprus.) These were followed by Bulgaria and Romania in 2007. Russia's regime had interpreted these expansions as violations against NATO's promise to not expand "one inch to the east" in 1990. Russia engaged in a number of bilateral disputes about gas supplies with Belarus and Ukraine which endangered gas supplies to Europe. Russia also engaged in a minor war with Georgia in 2008.

Supported by the United States and some European countries, Kosovo's government unilaterally declared independence from Serbia on February 17, 2008.

Public opinion in the EU turned against enlargement, partially due to what was seen as over-eager expansion including Turkey gaining candidate status. The European Constitution was rejected in France and the Netherlands, and then (as the Treaty of Lisbon) in Ireland, although a second vote passed in Ireland in 2009.

The financial crisis of 2007–08 affected Europe, and government responded with austerity measures. Limited financial capability of the smaller EU nations (most notably Greece) to handle their debts led to social unrest, government liquidation, and financial insolvency. In May 2010, the German parliament agreed to loan 22.4 billion euros to Greece over three years, with the stipulation that Greece follow strict austerity measures. See European sovereign-debt crisis.

Beginning in 2014, Ukraine has been in a state of revolution and unrest with two breakaway regions (Donetsk and Lugansk) attempting to join Russia as full federal subjects. (See War in Donbass.) On March 16, a referendum was held in Crimea leading to the de facto secession of Crimea and its largely internationally unrecognized annexation to the Russian Federation as the Republic of Crimea.

In June 2016, in a referendum in the United Kingdom on the country's membership in the European Union, 52% of voters voted to leave the EU, leading to the complex Brexit separation process and negotiations, which led to political and economic changes for both the UK and the remaining European Union countries. The UK left the EU on January 31, 2020.

The European Union went through several crises. The European debt crisis caused severe economic problems to several eurozone member states, most severely Greece. The 2015 migration crisis led to several million people entering the EU illegally in a short period of time. Many died at sea. Growing cynicism and distrust of the established parties led to a sharp rise in the 2014 European Parliament Elections in the vote shares of several eurosceptic parties, including the League in Italy, Alternative for Germany, and the Finns Party in Finland.

Transatlantic connections

Strong ties linked the U.S. and Canada with Britain and Europe. The military alliance of NATO expanded after the end of the Cold War and engaged in wars in the Balkans and Afghanistan. The U.S. and Britain continue to maintain a Special Relationship.

Eastern Europe

 
With the fall of the Iron Curtain in 1989, the political landscape of the Eastern Bloc, and indeed the world, changed. In the German reunification, the Federal Republic of Germany peacefully absorbed the German Democratic Republic in 1990. In 1991, COMECON, the Warsaw Pact, and the Soviet Union were dissolved. Many European nations that had been part of the Soviet Union regained their independence (Belarus, Moldova, Ukraine, as well as the Baltic States of Latvia, Lithuania, and Estonia). Czechoslovakia peacefully separated into the Czech Republic and Slovakia in 1993. Many countries of this region joined the European Union, namely Bulgaria, the Czech Republic, Croatia, Estonia, Hungary, Latvia, Lithuania, Poland, Romania, Slovakia and Slovenia. The term "EU11 countries" refer to the Central, Eastern and Baltic European member states that accessed in 2004 and after: in 2004 the Czech Republic, Estonia, Latvia, Lithuania, Hungary, Poland, Slovenia, and the Slovak Republic; in 2007 Bulgaria, Romania; and in 2013 Croatia.

Generally, they soon encountered the following economic problems: high inflation, high unemployment, low economic growth, and high government debt. By 2000 these economies were stabilized, and between 2004 and 2013 all of them joined the European Union.

Russo-Ukrainian War

The Russo-Ukrainian War is an ongoing and protracted conflict that started in February 2014, primarily involving Russia and pro-Russian forces on one hand, and Ukraine on the other. The war has centred on the status of Crimea and parts of the Donbas, which are internationally recognised as part of Ukraine. Tensions between Russia and Ukraine erupted especially from 2021 to 2022, when it became apparent that Russia was considering launching a military invasion of Ukraine. In February 2022, the crisis deepened, and diplomatic talks to subdue Russia failed; this culminated in Russia moving forces into the separatist controlled regions on February 22, 2022. After repeated warnings the European Union, Britain, the United States, and Germany denounced the movement as an invasion and imposed sanctions.

Terrorism 

In the 1980s and 1990s, Islamic militancy in pursuit of religious and political goals increased, many militants drawing inspiration from Iran's 1979 Islamic Revolution. In the 1990s, well-known violent acts that targeted civilians were the World Trade Center bombing by Islamic terrorists on February 26, 1993, the Tokyo subway sarin attack by Aum Shinrikyo on March 20, 1995, and the bombing of Oklahoma City's Murrah Federal Building in April 1995. Religion was a main factor in most cases. Special-interest terrorism was use by organized pressure groups of violent action, as in anti-abortion violence and environmental terrorism.

Middle East

Hezbollah ("Party of God") is an Islamist movement and political party founded in Lebanon in 1985 to achieve an Islamic revolution in Lebanon and the withdrawal of Israeli forces from Lebanon. It carried out missile attacks and suicide bombings against Israeli targets.

Egyptian Islamic Jihad seeks an Islamic state in Egypt. The group was formed in 1980 as an umbrella organization for militant student groups which were formed after the leadership of the Muslim Brotherhood renounced violence. In 1981, it assassinated Egyptian president Anwar Sadat. On November 17, 1997, at the Luxor massacre, it machine-gunned 58 Japanese and European vacationers and four Egyptians.

The first Palestinian suicide attack took place in 1989. In the 1990s, Hamas became well known for suicide bombings. Palestinian militant organizations have been responsible for rocket attacks on Israel, IED attacks, shootings, and stabbings.

Asia
Aum Shinrikyo, now known as Aleph, is a Japanese religious group and terrorist organization. On June 28, 1994, Aum Shinrikyo members released sarin gas from several sites in Matsumoto, Japan, killing eight and injuring 200 in what became known as the Matsumoto incident. On March 20, 1995, Aum Shinrikyo members released sarin gas in a coordinated attack on five trains in the Tokyo subway system, killing 12 commuters and damaging the health of about 5,000 others in what became known as the subway sarin incident. In May 1995, Asahara and other senior leaders were arrested and the group's membership rapidly decreased.

Russia

Chechen separatists, led by Shamil Basayev, carried out several attacks on Russian targets between 1994 and 2006. In the June 1995 Budyonnovsk hospital hostage crisis, Basayev-led separatists took over 1,000 civilians hostage in a hospital in the southern Russian city of Budyonnovsk. When Russian special forces attempted to free the hostages, 105 civilians and 25 Russian troops were killed.

USA: Attacks of September 11

By far the biggest episode was the September 11, 2001, attack on New York and Washington by al Qaeda. Elsewhere the Middle East was the main locale for terrorism.

On the morning of September 11, 2001, four airliners were hijacked by 19 members of the terrorist organization al-Qaeda. One struck the North Tower of the World Trade Center in New York City; with a second striking the South Tower, resulting in the collapse of both 110-story skyscrapers, and the destruction of the World Trade Center. The third hijacked plane was crashed into the Pentagon (the headquarters of the United States Department of Defense) outside Washington. The 9/11 attack was the single deadliest international terrorist incident and the most devastating foreign attack on American soil since the Japanese surprise attack on Pearl Harbor on December 7, 1941. The U.S. declared war on terrorism, beginning with an attack on al-Qaeda and its Taliban supporters in Afghanistan, that lasted into 2021.

Other major episodes include the 2002 Moscow theater hostage crisis, the 2003 Istanbul bombings, the 2004 Madrid train bombings, the 2004 Beslan school hostage crisis, the 2005 London bombings, the 2005 New Delhi bombings, the 2007 Yazidi communities bombings, the 2008 Mumbai Hotel Siege, the 2009 Makombo massacre, the 2011 Norway attacks, the 2013 Iraq attacks, the 2014 Camp Speicher massacre, the 2014 Gamboru Ngala attack, the 2015 Paris attacks, the 2016 Karrada bombing, the 2016 Mosul massacre, the 2016 Hamam al-Alil massacre, the 2017 Mogadishu bombings and the 2017 Sinai attack.

In the 21st century, most victims of terrorist attacks have been killed in Iraq, Afghanistan, Nigeria, Syria, Pakistan, India, Somalia or Yemen.

Peace and warfare
Michael Mandelbaum explains that the 25 years after 1989 were peaceful for three basic reasons. The collapse of the USSR enabled the "liberal hegemony" of the United States, working closely with NATO and other allies. Secondly democracy grew rapidly and as the "democratic peace theory" states, democracies rarely fight each other. Finally, globalization caused prosperity and interdependence.

What warfare did exist from 1990 to 2002 involved civil wars. They include the Somali Civil War (ongoing) and the Second Congo War in Africa, the Yugoslav Wars in Europe, the Tajikistani Civil War in Asia, and the Cenepa War in South America. From 2003 onward they include War in Darfur; Iraq War; Kivu conflict in Congo; Libyan Civil War (2011); Syrian civil war since 2011; War in Iraq (2013–2017); the Russo-Ukrainian War since 2014; International military intervention against ISIL in Iraq since 2014; and Yemeni Civil War (2014–present).Andreas Krieg and Jean-Marc Rickli, Surrogate Warfare: The Transformation of War in the Twenty-First Century (2019).

Afghanistan

The Northern Alliance and NATO-led ISAF invaded Afghanistan on October 7, 2001, and overthrew the Al-Qaeda-supportive Taliban government. Troops remained to install a democratic government, fight a slowly escalating insurgency, and to hunt for Al-Qaeda leader Osama bin Laden who was killed by American troops 10 years later, on May 2, 2011. On December 31, 2016, NATO forces officially ended combat operations in Afghanistan. On August 15, 2021, the Taliban took control of Afghanistan again. All NATO forces left on August 31, 2021.

See also

 Contemporary history
 Post–Cold War era
 Second Cold War
 Cyberwarfare 
 Foreign relations of Russia
 History of globalization
 History of terrorism
 List of modern conflicts in the Middle East
 List of modern conflicts in North Africa
 List of wars: 1990–2002
 List of wars: 2003–present
 History of Russia (1991–present)
 Trade war
 War on terror
 World War III

Notes

Further reading
 Adebajo, Adekeye, ed. Curse of Berlin: Africa After the Cold War (Oxford UP, 2014).
 Allitt, Patrick N. America after the Cold War: The First 30 Years (2020).
 Andersson, Jenny. The future of the world: Futurology, futurists, and the struggle for the post cold war imagination (Oxford UP, 2018).
 Ahram, Ariel I. War and Conflict in the Middle East and North Africa (John Wiley & Sons, 2020).
 Asare, Prince, and Richard Barfi. "The Impact of Covid-19 Pandemic on the Global Economy: Emphasis on Poverty Alleviation and Economic Growth." Economics 8.1 (2021): 32–43 online.
 Aziz, Nusrate, and M. Niaz Asadullah. "Military spending, armed conflict and economic growth in developing countries in the post–Cold War era." Journal of Economic Studies 44.1 (2017): 47–68.
 Brands, Hal. Making the unipolar moment: U.S. foreign policy and the rise of the post-Cold War order (2016).
 Brown, Archie. The rise and fall of communism (Random House, 2009).
 Brügger, Niels, ed, Web25: Histories from the first 25 years of the world wide web (Peter Lang, 2017).
 Cameron, Fraser. US foreign policy after the cold war: global hegemon or reluctant sheriff? (Psychology Press, 2005).
 Cassani, Andrea, and Luca Tomini. Autocratization in post-cold war political regimes (Springer, 2018).
 Clapton, William ed. Risk and Hierarchy in International Society: Liberal Interventionism in the Post-Cold War Era (Palgrave Macmillan UK. 2014)
 Dai, Jinhua, and Lisa Rofel, eds. After the Post–Cold War: The Future of Chinese History (Duke UP, 2018).
 Duong, Thanh. Hegemonic globalisation: U.S. centrality and global strategy in the emerging world order (Routledge, 2017).
 The Economist. The Pocket World in 2021 (2020) excerpt, annual
 Engerman, David C. et al. eds. The Cambridge History of America and the World, Volume IV, 1945 to the Present (Cambridge University Press, 2021).  ISBN 978110841927 online review
 Gertler, Mark, and Simon Gilchrist. "What happened: Financial factors in the great recession." Journal of Economic Perspectives 32.3 (2018): 3–30. online 
 Harrison, Ewam. The Post-Cold War International System: Strategies, Institutions and Reflexivity (2004).
 Henriksen, Thomas H. Cycles in US Foreign Policy Since the Cold War (Palgrave Macmillan, 2017) excerpt.
 Howe, Joshua P. Behind the curve: science and the politics of global warming (U of Washington Press, 2014).
 Jackson, Robert J. and Philip Towle. Temptations of Power: The United States in Global Politics after 9/11 (2007)
 Kotkin, Stephen. Armageddon Averted: The Soviet Collapse, 1970–2000 (2nd ed. 2008) excerpt
 Lamy, Steven L., et al. Introduction to global politics (4th ed. Oxford UP, 2017)
 Mandelbaum, Michael The Rise and Fall of Peace on Earth (Oxford UP, 2019) why so much peace 1989–2015. excerpt
 Maull, Hanns W., ed. The rise and decline of the post-Cold War international order (Oxford UP, 2018).
 O'Neill, William. A Bubble in Time: America During the Interwar Years, 1989–2001 (2009) Excerpt, popular history
 Osterhammel, Jurgen, and Niels P. Petersson. Globalization: a short history. (2005).
 Pekkanen, Saadia M., John Ravenhill, and Rosemary Foot, eds. Oxford handbook of the international relations of Asia (Oxford UP, 2014), comprehensive coverage.
 Priestland, David. The Red Flag: Communism and the making of the modern world (Penguin UK, 2009). online
 Ravenhill, John, ed. Global political economy (5th ed. Oxford UP, 2017) excerpt
 Reid-Henry, Simon. Empire of Democracy: The Remaking of the West Since the Cold War (2019) excerpt
 Rosefielde, Steven. Putin's Russia: Economy, Defence and Foreign Policy (2020) excerpt
 
 Rubin, Robert, and Jacob Weisberg. In an uncertain world: tough choices from Wall Street to Washington (2015).
 Rudolph, Peter. "The Sino-American World Conflict" (German Institute for International and Security Affairs. SWP Research Paper #3, February 2020). doi: 10.18449/2020RP03 online
 Sarotte, Mary Elise, ed. 1989: The Struggle to Create Post-Cold War Europe (Princeton UP, 2014).
 Schenk, Catherine R. International economic relations since 1945 (2nd ed. 2021).
 Service, Robert. Comrades! A History of World Communism (Harvard UP, 2007).
 Smith, Rhona K.M. et al. International Human Rights (4th ed. 2018)
 Smith, Rhona KM. Texts and materials on international human rights (4th ed. Routledge, 2020).
 Stent, Angela E. The Limits of Partnership: U.S. Russian Relations in the Twenty-First Century (Princeton UP, 2014); excerpt and text search
 Stiglitz, Joseph E. The roaring nineties: A new history of the world's most prosperous decade (Norton, 2004), economic history
 Strong, Jason. The 2010s: Looking Back At A Dramatic Decade (2019) online
 Taylor-Gooby, Peter, Benjamin Leruth, and Heejung Chung, eds. After austerity: Welfare state transformation in Europe after the great recession (Oxford UP, 2017).
 
 Tooze, Adam. Shutdown: How Covid Shook the World's Economy (2021).
 United Nations. World Economic Situation and Prospects 2020 (2020) online annual reports
 United Nations. World Economic and Social Survey 2010 – Retooling Global Development'' (2010) online

External links
 Annual Register (London), covers international diplomatic, political and economic affairs for all nations; online through libraries

History of international relations
European political history
20th century in politics
21st century in politics
Post–Cold War era